The 2011 NACAC Combined Events Championships were held in Mona, Saint Andrew, Jamaica, at the Usain Bolt Track of the University of the West Indies on May 27–28, 2011. 
A detailed report on the event and an appraisal of the results was given.

Complete results were published.

Medallists

Results

Men's Decathlon
Key

Women's Heptathlon
Key

Participation
An unofficial count yields the participation of 28 athletes from 12 countries.

 (2)
 (3)
 (1)
 (2)
 (1)
 (1)
 (1)
 (4)
/ (1)
 (4)
 (2)
 (5)
Invited:
 (1)

See also
 2011 in athletics (track and field)

References

Pan American Combined Events Cup
NACAC Combined Events Championships
NACAC Combined Events Championships
Combined Events